The Association of Christian Universities and Colleges in Asia (ACUCA) is an organization of Christian universities and colleges in Asia, dedicated to Christian witness and service in the field of education. It consists of 69 institutions: 3 in Hong Kong, 2 in India, 15 in Indonesia, 15 in Japan, 7 in Korea, 1 in Myanmar, 13 in the Philippines, 9 in Taiwan and 4 in Thailand.

Membership

Hong Kong
Chung Chi College, Chinese University of Hong Kong
Hong Kong Baptist University
Lingnan University

India
Christ University
Lady Doak College

Indonesia
Atma Jaya Catholic University of Indonesia
Atma Jaya University, Yogyakarta
Christian University of Indonesia
Dhyana Pura University
Duta Wacana Christian University
Krida Wacana Christian University
Maranatha Christian University
Parahyangan Catholic University
Pelita Harapan University
Petra Christian University
Sanata Dharma University
Satya Wacana Christian University
Soegijapranata Catholic University
Tarakanita School of Communication and Secretarial Studies
Widya Mandala Catholic University

Japan
Aoyama Gakuin University
Doshisha University
Hiroshima Jogakuin University
Hokusei Gakuen University
International Christian University
J. F. Oberlin University
Kobe College
Kwansei Gakuin University
Meiji Gakuin University
Momoyama Gakuin University
Nanzan University
Osaka Jogakuin University
Seinan Gakuin University
Sophia University
Tokyo Woman's Christian University

South Korea
Ewha Womans University
Handong Global University
Hannam University
Keimyung University
Sogang University
Soongsil University
Yonsei University

Myanmar
Myanmar Institute of Theology

Philippines
Assumption College San Lorenzo
Ateneo de Manila University
Central Philippine University
De La Salle University
De La Salle University Dasmariñas
Filamer Christian University
La Consolacion University Philippines
Miriam College
Philippine Christian University
Silliman University
St. Paul University Philippines
Trinity University of Asia
Wesleyan University Philippines

Taiwan
Aletheia University
Chang Jung Christian University
Chung Yuan Christian University
Fu Jen Catholic University
Providence University
Soochow University
St. John's University
Tunghai University
Wenzao Ursuline College of Languages

Thailand
Asia-Pacific International University
Assumption University
 Christian University of Thailand
Payap University

References

External links
Association of Christian Universities and Colleges in Asia

 
Christian universities and colleges
Lists of Christian universities and colleges